In Greek mythology, Argus (Ancient Greek: Ἄργος Argos) was the king and eponym of Argos.

Family 
He was a son of Zeus and Niobe, daughter of Phoroneus, and was possibly the brother of Pelasgus. Argus married either Evadne, the daughter of Strymon and Neaera, or Peitho the Oceanid, and had by her six sons: Criasus, Ecbasus, Iasus, Peiranthus (or Peiras, Peirasus, Peiren), Epidaurus and Tiryns (said by Pausanias to be the namesake of the city Tiryns). According to Pausanias, yet another son of Argus was the Argive Phorbas (elsewhere his grandson through Criasus). Meanwhile, Cercops speaks of Argus Panoptes as the son of Argus and Ismene.

Reign 
Argus succeeded to his maternal grandfather's power over Peloponnese, naming the kingdom after himself. A scholiast on Homer calls Argus the son and successor of Apis. Jerome and Eusebius, citing the now-lost history of Castor of Rhodes, also agree in making Argus the successor of Apis, and son of Zeus and Niobe, and give the length of his reign over "Argeia" (Argos) as 70 years.

The tomb of Argus in Argos was shown as late as the times of Pausanias, who also made mention of a grove sacred to Argus in Lacedaemon where some from the Argive army took refuge after being defeated by Cleomenes I, and were subsequently burned to death therein.

Notes

References 
 Apollodorus, The Library with an English Translation by Sir James George Frazer, F.B.A., F.R.S. in 2 Volumes, Cambridge, MA, Harvard University Press; London, William Heinemann Ltd. 1921. ISBN 0-674-99135-4. Online version at the Perseus Digital Library. Greek text available from the same website.
Gaius Julius Hyginus, Fabulae from The Myths of Hyginus translated and edited by Mary Grant. University of Kansas Publications in Humanistic Studies. Online version at the Topos Text Project.
Pausanias, Description of Greece with an English Translation by W.H.S. Jones, Litt.D., and H.A. Ormerod, M.A., in 4 Volumes. Cambridge, MA, Harvard University Press; London, William Heinemann Ltd. 1918. . Online version at the Perseus Digital Library
Pausanias, Graeciae Descriptio. 3 vols. Leipzig, Teubner. 1903.  Greek text available at the Perseus Digital Library.
Pseudo-Clement, Recognitions from Ante-Nicene Library Volume 8, translated by Smith, Rev. Thomas. T. & T. Clark, Edinburgh. 1867. Online version at theio.com
Stephanus of Byzantium, Stephani Byzantii Ethnicorum quae supersunt, edited by August Meineike (1790-1870), published 1849. A few entries from this important ancient handbook of place names have been translated by Brady Kiesling. Online version at the Topos Text Project.
 .

Princes in Greek mythology
Kings of Argos
Kings in Greek mythology
Children of Zeus
Inachids
Argive characters in Greek mythology
Mythology of Argos